Marleen Kuppens (born 30 April 1959, in Neerpelt) is a Belgian sprint canoer who competed from the mid-1970s to the mid-1980s. Competing in three Summer Olympics, she earned her best finish of ninth in the K-2 500 m event at Los Angeles in 1984.

References
 Sports-reference.com profile

1959 births
Belgian female canoeists
Canoeists at the 1976 Summer Olympics
Canoeists at the 1980 Summer Olympics
Canoeists at the 1984 Summer Olympics
Living people
Olympic canoeists of Belgium
People from Neerpelt
Sportspeople from Limburg (Belgium)
20th-century Belgian women